Francisco Andrés de Carvajal, OFM (died August 28, 1577) was a Roman Catholic prelate who served as the Archbishop of Santo Domingo (1570–1577), Primate of the Indies,  and the third Bishop of Puerto Rico (1568–1570).

Biography
Francisco Andrés de Carvajal was ordained a priest in the Order of Friars Minor. On June 2, 1568, he was appointed by the King of Spain and confirmed by Pope Pius V as the third Bishop of Puerto Rico. On May 10, 1570, he was appointed by the King of Spain and confirmed by Pope Pius V as Archbishop of Santo Domingo where served until his death on August 28, 1577.

References

External links and additional sources
 (for Chronology of Bishops) 
 (for Chronology of Bishops) 
 (for Chronology of Bishops) 
 (for Chronology of Bishops) 

1577 deaths
Roman Catholic archbishops of Santo Domingo
Bishops appointed by Pope Pius V
Franciscan bishops
16th-century Roman Catholic archbishops in the Dominican Republic
16th-century Roman Catholic bishops in Puerto Rico